Moraleda de Zafayona is a municipality located in the province of Granada, Spain. According to the 2004 census (INE), the town's population was 2769. 

It is mainly a farming community with ancillary trades and workshops. It has two banks, a medical centre, prep/junior and senior schools, a sub-post office, a library, five small supermarkets, four petrol stations, a summer-time lido, two small hotels, bakers and a number of bars.

References

Municipalities in the Province of Granada